Lists of murderers include lists of rampage killers who kill two or more victims in a short time, including mass murderers and spree killers, and lists of serial killers, who murder three or more people over more than a month, with a significant period of time between the murders.

Rampage killers
 List of rampage killers

By place
 List of rampage killers (home intruders)
 List of rampage killers (home intruders in the United States)
 List of rampage killers (school massacres)
 List of rampage killers (workplace killings)
 List of rampage killers (workplace violence in the military)
 List of rampage killers (vehicular homicide)

By region
 List of rampage killers in Africa
 List of rampage killers in the Americas
 List of rampage killers in Asia
 List of rampage killers in Europe
 List of rampage killers in Oceania and Maritime Southeast Asia

Familicides by region

 List of rampage killers (familicides in Africa)
 List of rampage killers (familicides in Americas)
 List of rampage killers (familicides in Asia)
 List of rampage killers (familicides in Oceania and Maritime Southeast Asia)
 List of rampage killers (familicides in Europe)
 List of rampage killers (familicides in China)
 List of rampage killers (familicides in the United States)

Other
 List of rampage killers (religious, political, or ethnic crimes)

Serial killers

 List of serial killers before 1900
 List of serial killers by number of victims
 List of serial killers by country
 List of German serial killers
 List of Russian serial killers
 List of serial killers in the United States

Other

List of murder convictions without a body
List of youngest killers

See also
 Lists of murders

Notes

 
Lists of lists of people